Fisketorvet - Copenhagen Mall is a shopping centre located on Kalvebod Brygge waterfront in Copenhagen, Denmark. It is Denmark's third largest shopping center by size.

Fisketorvet - Copenhagen Mall regularly hosts events for the guests such as:  
 Fastelavn (a Danish Carnival)
 Copenhagen Cooking & Food Festival
 Holiday tickets
The centre is located at Fisketorvet Dybbølsbro station next to the harbour.

History
The shopping centre takes its name after Copenhagen's old fish market which was located at the site from 1958 until 1999 when it moved to new premises in the North Harbour. The shopping centre was designed by Kiehlers Architects (Carl Gustaf Åkerström) and opened on 10 October 2000. It is owned by Unibail-Rodamco.

Facilities
Fisketorvet has a floor area of 58,000 square metres with 120 stores, making it Denmark's third largest shopping centre. It also contains 15 restaurants and cafés as well as a CinemaxX cinema with 14 screens and IMAX.

Stores include:

References

Shopping centres in Copenhagen
Vesterbro, Copenhagen
Shopping malls established in 2000
Westfield Group